The Sound and the Fury is an American drama film directed by James Franco. It is the second film version of the 1929 novel of the same name by William Faulkner (the previous adaptation, directed by Martin Ritt, was released in 1959). The film was released in a limited release and through video on demand on October 23, 2015, by New Films International.

Plot
The film focuses on the Compson family, and their struggles to adjust to the changing society of the 20th century Deep South, told from four different perspectives: the mentally disabled Benjy Compson, the fragile intellectual Quentin, the vile Jason and his family's old black servant, Dilsey.

Cast
 James Franco as Benjy Compson
 Jacob Loeb as Quentin Compson
 Joey King as Miss Quentin
 Tim Blake Nelson as Jason Compson III
 Loretta Devine as Dilsey
 Ahna O'Reilly as Caddy Compson
 Scott Haze as Jason Compson IV
 Kylen Davis as Luster
 Seth Rogen as Telegraph operator (cameo)
 Danny McBride as Sheriff (cameo)
 Dwight Henry as Roskus
 Logan Marshall-Green as Dalton Ames

In an early interview with Franco in 2013, the director suggested he wanted Jon Hamm in the role of Mr. Compson. Hamm's schedule was too tight and the role ultimately went to Tim Blake Nelson, but in spite of this the story that Hamm was in the movie persisted. Even as late as the film's screening at the 2014 Toronto International Film Festival some playbills still made this claim, and the posters had to be reprinted before opening.

Production
In January 2014, it was reported Keegan Allen, Tim Blake Nelson, Seth Rogen, Danny McBride, Loretta DeVine, and Janet Gretzky had joined the cast of the film.

Release
The film had its world premiere at the Venice Film Festival on September 5, 2014. It was screened at the Toronto International Film Festival on September 6, 2014 at the Ryerson Theatre. The film was scheduled to be released in a limited release and through video on demand on October 23, 2015.

Reception
The film received mostly negative reviews from film critics, with many feeling that Franco was incapable of presenting such a complex novel in a cinematic fashion. Paul McInnis of The Guardian, writing from Toronto, said, “Franco attempts to recreate the book's impressionistic style and complex structure. He makes a fist of it, but in concentrating so much on the art he fails to give the viewer any story or characters to care about.”

Andrew Barker of Variety felt that the film was "a folly, failing to capture the weird, entrancing, often maddening ambiance of the great writer’s elliptical masterpiece, and its surfeit of half-baked film-student flourishes and needless cameos occasionally give it an amateur-hour feel. But Franco nonetheless shows improvement over 2013’s As I Lay Dying, and well, it’s hard to fault him for trying."

Currently, review aggregator Rotten Tomatoes gives the film a 'rotten' rating of 25%.

References

External links
 
 
 Official trailer on YouTube

2014 films
2014 drama films
American drama films
Films based on American novels
Films based on works by William Faulkner
Films directed by James Franco
Films set in Mississippi
Southern Gothic films
2010s English-language films
2010s American films